Carlos Alberto De Giorgi (born 23 April 1984) is an Argentine professional footballer who plays as a goalkeeper for Talleres de Perico.

Career
After a youth stint with Talleres, De Giorgi began his career with Racing de Córdoba in Torneo Argentino A. He remained for three seasons, one of which being in Primera B Nacional after 2003–04 promotion, whilst making twenty appearances. In 2006, Gimnasia y Esgrima signed De Giorgi. He didn't appear in the Argentine Primera División, departing a year after signing in 2007 to play in the second tier with Belgrano. Three appearances followed. De Giorgi rejoined Gimnasia y Esgrima in 2009, subsequently participating twenty-three times in 2009–10. A move to Atlético de Rafaela followed, along with promotion as champions.

On 30 June 2011, De Giorgi moved to Ferro Carril Oeste to remain in Primera B Nacional. He was selected in thirty-eight matches in his first campaign, but failed to play in 2012–13. De Giorgi spent the following twelve months with Torneo Argentino A's Central Norte. They were relegated in his sole season with the club. July 2014 saw De Giorgi return to Atlético de Rafaela, where he featured on seventeen occasions in the Primera División, before the goalkeeper went back to Gimnasia y Esgrima on 17 July 2016 for a third spell. His first appearance didn't arrive until October 2018, as he played the full duration of a win over Instituto.

June 2020 saw De Giorgi depart Gimnasia following the expiration of his contract. Ahead of the 2020 season, De Giorgi signed with Altos Hornos Zapla. A year later, in November 2021, he moved to Talleres de Perico.

Career statistics
.

Honours
Racing de Córdoba
Torneo Argentino A: 2003–04

Atlético de Rafaela
Primera B Nacional: 2010–11

References

External links

1984 births
Living people
Footballers from Córdoba, Argentina
Argentine footballers
Association football goalkeepers
Torneo Argentino A players
Primera Nacional players
Argentine Primera División players
Racing de Córdoba footballers
Gimnasia y Esgrima de Jujuy footballers
Club Atlético Belgrano footballers
Atlético de Rafaela footballers
Ferro Carril Oeste footballers
Central Norte players
Altos Hornos Zapla players
Talleres de Perico footballers